This is a list of genera in the insect family Diaspididae, the armored scales.

A

Abgrallaspis
Acanthaspidiotus
Acanthomytilus
Achionaspis
Achorophora
Acontonidia
Acutaspis
Adiscodiaspis
Adiscofiorinia
Afiorinia
Africaspis
Africonidia
Agrophaspis
Albastaspis
Aleucaspis
Alioides
Allantomytilus
Aloaspis
Ambigaspis
Amphisoma
Anaimalaia
Anamefiorinia
Anaspidiotus
Anastomoderma
Ancepaspis
Andaspis
Annonogena
Annulaspis
Anoplaspis
Anotaspis
Antakaspis
Anzaspis
Aonidia
Aonidiella
Aonidomytilus
Aspidaspis
Aspidiella
Aspidioides
Aspidiotus
Aspidonymus
Asymmetraspis
Augulaspis
Aulacaspis
Avidovaspis

B

Balachowskiella
Balaspis
Banahaoa
Bantudiaspis
Batarasa
Bayokaspis
Bayuraspis
Benaparlatoria
Berlesaspidiotus
Berlesaspis
Bigymnaspis

C

 Caia
Cameronaspis
Carulaspis
Cephalaspidiotus
Chentraspis
Chimania
Chinaspis
Chionandaspis
Chionaspis
Chlidaspis
Chortinaspis
Chrysomphalus
Circulaspis
Clavaspidiotus
Clavaspis
Coccomytilus
Comstockiella
Contigaspis
Cooleyaspis
Coronaspis
Costalimaspis
Crassaspidiotus
Crassaspis
Credodiaspis
Crenulaspidiotus
Crockeraspis
Cryptaspidiotus
Cryptaspidus
Crypthemichionaspis
Cryptodiaspis
Cryptoparlatorea
Cryptoparlatoreopsis
Cryptophyllaspis
Cryptoselenaspidus
Cupidaspis
Cynodontaspis

D

Dactylaspis
Damaia
Daraspis
Dentachionaspis
Dentaspis
Diaonidia
Diaphoraspis
Diaspidiotus
Diaspidistis
Diaspidopus
Diaspis
Diastolaspis
Diaulacaspis
Dichosoma
Dicirculaspis
Diclavaspis
Dinaspis
Discodiaspis
Doriopus
Ductofrontaspis
Dungunia
Duplachionaspis
Duplaspidiotus
Duplaspis
Dynaspidiotus

E

Emmereziaspis
Entaspidiotus
Epidiaspis
Epifiorinia
Eremiaspis
Eucleaspis
Eudinaspis
Eugreeniella
Eulaingia
Exuviaspis

F

Faureaspis
Felixiella
Fernaldanna
Ferreroaspis
Ferrisidea
Fijifiorinia
Finaspis
Fiorinia
Fissuraspis
Formosaspis
Fraseraspis
Froggattiella
Fulaspis
Furcaspis
Furchadaspis
Fusilaspis

G

Gadaspis
Galeomytilus
Galeraspis
Genistaspis
Geodiaspis
Getulaspis
Gomezmenoraspis
Gomphaspidiotus
Gonaspidiotus
Gramenaspis
Greenaspis
Greeniella
Greenoidea
Guineaspis
Guizhoaspis
Gymnaspis
Gynandraspis

H

Haliaspis
Heimaspis
Helaspis
Helenococcus
Hemaspidis
Hemiberlesia
Hemigymnaspis
Hexandaspis
Himalaspis
Hovaspis
Howardia
Hulaspis
Hybridaspis
Hyparrheniaspis
Hypaspidiotus

I

Icaraspidiotus
Ichthyaspis
Imerinaspis
Inchoaspis
Incisaspis
Ischnafiorinia
Ischnaspis

K

Kandraspis
Keralaspis
Kochummenaspis
Koroneaspis
Kuchingaspis
Kulatinganaspis
Kuwanaspis
Kyphosoma

L

Labidaspis
Laingaspis
Lapazia
Larutaspis
Ledaspis
Leonardianna
Lepidosaphes
Leptodiaspis
Leucaspis
Ligaspis
Lindingaspis
Lindingeria
Lineaspis
Lopholeucaspis
Loranthaspis

M

Madagaspis
Madaparlaspis
Magnospinus
Mammata
Mancaspis
Mangaspis
Marchalaspis
Marginaspis
Maskellanna
Maskellia
Mauritiaspis
Mayonia
Medangaspis
Megacanthaspis
Megaspidiotus
Melanaspis
Melayumytilus
Melissoaspis
Mempelaspis
Mercetaspis
Mesoselenaspidus
Metandaspis
Microparlatoria
Mimeraspis
Mimusaspis
Mitraspis
Mitulaspis
Mixaspis
Mohelnaspis
Monaonidiella
Mongrovaspis
Moraspis
Morganella
Multispinaspis
Murataspis
Mycetaspis
Myrtaspis
Myrtophila

N

Namaquea
 Namibia
Nanhaiaspis
Narayanaspis
Neochionaspis
Neoclavaspis
Neoischnaspis
Neoleonardia
Neoleucaspis
Neomorgania
Neoparlaspis
Neoparlatoria
Neopinnaspis
Neoquernaspis
Neoselenaspidus
Neparla
Nicholiella
Nigridiaspis
Nikkoaspis
Nimbaspis
Niveaspis
Notandaspis
Nudachaspis

O

Obtusaspis
Oceanaspidiotus
Octaspidiotus
Odonaspis
Operculaspis
Opuntiaspis
Osiraspis

P

Palauaspis
Palinaspis
Pallulaspis
Pandanaspis
Parachionaspis
Paradiaspis
Paraepidiaspis
Parafiorinia
Paraleucaspis
Parandaspis
Paranewsteadia
Paraonidia
Parapandanaspis
Paraparlagena
Paraselenaspidus
Parlagena
Parlaspis
Parlatoreopsis
Parlatoria
Parrottia
Pelliculaspis
Pellucidaspis
Pentacicola
Phaspis
Phaulaspis
Phaulomytilus
Pinangaspis
Pinnaspis
Poliaspis
Poliaspoides
Porogymnaspis
Praecocaspis
Primaspis
Proceraspis
Prodiaspis
Prodigiaspis
Protancepaspis
Protargionia
Protodiaspis
Pseudaonidia
Pseudaulacaspis
Pseudischnaspis
Pseudodiaspis
Pseudodonaspis
Pseudoleucaspis
Pseudoparlatoria
Pseudoselenaspidus
Pseudotargionia
Pudaspis
Pygalataspis
Pygidiaspis

Q

Quernaspis

R

Radionaspis
Ramachandraspis
Reclavaspis
Relhaniaspis
Remotaspidiotus
Rhizaspidiotus
Rolaspis
Roureaspis
Rugaspidiotinus
Rugaspidiotus
Rugpapuaspis
Rungaspis
 Rutherfordia

S

Sadaotakagia
Saharaspis
Sakalavaspis
Sakaramyaspis
Salaspis
Salicicola
Santubongia
Saotomaspis
Schizaspis
Schizentaspidus
Scleromytilus
Sclopetaspis
Scytalaspis
Selenaspidopsis
Selenaspidus
Selenediella
Selenomphalus
Semelaspidus
Semonggokia
Serenaspis
Serrachionaspis
Serrataspis
Shansiaspis
Silvestraspis
Singapuraspis
Sinistraspis
Sinoquernaspis
Sishanaspis
Situlaspis
Smilacicola
Spinaspidiotus
Stramenaspis
Sudanaspis
Suluaspis
Symeria

T

Taiwanaspidiotus
Takagiaspis
Takahashiaspis
Tamilparla
Tamuraspis
Tanaparlatoria
 Targionia
Tecaspis
Tenuiaspis
Thoa
Thysanaspis
Thysanofiorinia
Torosapis
Triaspidis
Trichomytilus
Triraphaspis
Trischnaspis
Trullifiorinia
Tsimanaspis
Tsimbazaspis
Tulefiorinia

U

Ulucoccus
Umbaspis
Unachionaspis
Unaspidiotus
Unaspis
Ungulaspis

V

Varicaspis
Velataspis
Vinculaspis
Voraspis

X

Xanthophthalma
Xerophilaspis
Xiphuraspis

Y

Yomaspis
Youngus
Yuanaspis

References 

 Ben-Dov, Y., Miller, D.R. & Gibson, G.A.P. 2001. ScaleNet, Scale families in Diaspididae. 21 November 2012.

External links 
 USDA.gov: ScaleNet checklist of Diaspididae
USDA.gov: ScaleNet website

Diaspididae